Matekane Air Strip is a high elevation airstrip serving Matekane, Lesotho, with a runway that extends to the edge of a  cliff. The runway is often used by charity organizations and doctors to access remote villages in the area, and is known as one of the world's scariest runways.

See also

Transport in Lesotho
List of airports in Lesotho
List of shortest runways

References

External links
OpenStreetMap - Matekane Airstrip

Airports in Lesotho